Marseille-Saint-Charles (French: Gare de Marseille-Saint-Charles) is the main railway station and intercity bus station of Marseille, France. It is the southern terminus of the Paris–Marseille railway and western terminus of the Marseille–Ventimiglia railway.

It opened on 8 January 1848, having been built for the Chemins de fer de Paris à Lyon et à la Méditerranée (PLM) on the land of the former Saint Charles Cemetery. The station is perched on top of a small hill and is linked to the city centre by a monumental set of stairs. Since 2001, the TGV has dramatically reduced the travel time between Marseille and Northern France; traffic has increased from 7.1 million annual passengers in 2000 to 16.5 million in 2017. This makes the station the eleventh busiest in France.

History

Construction of the Saint-Charles grand staircase

Marseille-Saint-Charles was once a key stage on the sea voyage to Africa, the Middle East and the Far East, before the popularisation of flying. The station, originally isolated from the city, was equipped with a grand staircase, envisioned by Eugène Senès. His proposal was approved by the municipality on 3 July 1911, but delayed by World War I. Construction work started on 17 July 1923; the grand staircase was opened on 22 December 1925, before being formally inaugurated by President Gaston Doumergue on 24 April 1927. It is bordered by statues inspired by all the distant locations to which people sailed from Marseille's port.

Further expansion after World War II

Saint-Charles currently has 14 terminal platforms and four tracks which run through, all equipped with 1500 V DC overhead wire. Tracks run in various directions, towards Ventimiglia, Italy, the north, Briançon, as well as the harbour station of La Joliette. A first extension was opened after World War II. The buildings on the north side had been destroyed and were rebuilt to house the administration offices of the SNCF. A new between level was opened to enhance the flow of passengers. To the rear of the station along Boulevard Voltaire was the goods yard which was used up until the end of the 1990s by the SNCF's road freight operations, Sernam.

On New Year's Eve 1983, a bomb at the station killed two people; Ilich Ramírez Sánchez, known as Carlos the Jackal, was later convicted for what was classified as a terrorist attack. At the end of the 1990s a redevelopment project began with the opening of the Marseille Metro and bus interchange as well as the arrival of the LGV Méditerranée.

Arrival of the TGV
Since 2001, new underground parking lots and a tunnel have allowed the station to be renewed. A new hall, the Halle Honnorat, was created housing shops and services. The displacement of the regional coach station on the other side of the station allowed a new pedestrian square to be created, between the station and the Aix-Marseille University site of Saint-Charles. New pedestrian spaces with cafe terraces have also been created atop the grand stairs. In December 2007, a €230 million modernisation was completed.

On 1 October 2017, two women were killed in a knife attack at the train station before the perpetrator, an illegal immigrant from Tunisia, was shot dead by soldiers on patrol. His act was classified as jihadist terrorism by Europol.

Train services
The station is served by the following services:

High-speed services (TGV) Paris-Lyon Station - Valence TGV - Avignon TGV - Marseille Saint Charles
High-speed services (TGV Bruxelles-France) Brussels-Midi - Lille Europe / Lille-Flandres - Charles de Gaulle Airport 2 TGV - Lyon Part-Dieu - Avignon TGV - Marseille Saint Charles
High-speed services (AVE) Madrid-Atocha - Zaragoza - Barcelona-Sants - Perpignan - Montpellier Saint Roch - Avignon TGV - Aix-en-Provence TGV mp airport - Marseille Saint Charles
High-speed services (TGV-Alleo) Frankfurt (M) Hbf - Strasbourg-Ville - Mulhouse-Ville - Lyon Part-Dieu - Avignon TGV - Aix-en-Provence TGV mp airport - Marseille Saint Charles
High-speed services (TGV) Nancy - Strasbourg - Besançon-Franche-Comté-TGV - Dijon-Ville - Lyon Part-Dieu - Avignon TGV - Marseille Saint Charles - Cannes - Nice-Ville
High-speed services (TGV Lyria) Geneva-Cornavin - Marseille Saint Charles
High-speed services (TGV) Lyon Part-Dieu - Valence TGV Southern Rhône-Alps - Avignon TGV - Aix en Provence TGV mp airport - Marseille Saint Charles - Toulon - Les Arcs-Draguignan - Cannes - Nice-Ville
High-speed services (TGV) Le Havre - Rouen-Rive Droite - Versailles-Chantiers - Lyon Part-Dieu - Avignon TGV - Marseille Saint Charles
High-speed services (TGV) Rennes / Nantes - Le Mans - Lyon Part-Dieu - Avignon TGV - Marseille Saint Charles
High-speed services (Thalys) Amsterdam Centraal - Rotterdam Centraal - Antwerpen-Central - Bruxelles-Midi/Brussel-Zuid - Avignon TGV - Marseille Saint Charles (Summer Saturdays)

Intercity services (Intercités) Bordeaux Saint Jean - Toulouse-Matabiau - Narbonne - Béziers - Montpellier Saint Roch - Nîmes - Arles - Marseille Saint Charles
High-speed services (TGV Ouigo) Marne-la-Vallée / Lyon-Perrache - Lyon Saint-Exupéry - Avignon TGV - Marseille Saint Charles
Regional intercity services Lyon Part-Dieu - Montelimar - Orange - Avignon-Centre - Arles - Miramas - Marseille Saint Charles
Regional intercity services Portbou (Spain) - Perpignan - Béziers - Montpellier Saint Roch - Miramas - Vitrolles mp airport - Marseille Saint Charles
Regional intercity services Briançon - Gap - Sisteron - Aix en Provence Ville - Marseille Saint Charles
Regional intercity services Marseille Saint Charles - Toulon - Les Arcs-Draguignan St Raphael- Cannes - Antibes - Nice-Ville
Regional services Avignon-Centre - Arles - Miramas - Vitrolles mp airport - Marseille Euromediterranee - Marseille Saint Charles
Regional services Avignon TGV - Avignon Centre - Salon - Miramas - Vitrolles mp airport - Marseille Euromediterranee - Marseille Saint Charles
Local services Miramas - Fos-sur-Mer - Carry-le-Rouet - Séon St Henry - Marseille Saint Charles
Local services Pertuis - Aix-en-Provence Ville - Gardanne - Saint Antoine - Marseille Saint Charles
Local services Marseille Saint Antoine - Marseille Saint Charles
Local services Marseille Saint Charles - Marseille Blancarde - Aubagne - Toulon - (Hyères)
Local services Marseille Saint Charles - Marseille Blancarde - La Barasse - Aubagne

References

External links

 

1st arrondissement of Marseille
Buildings and structures in Marseille
Railway stations in Marseille
Marseille
Marseille